Forcht Group of Kentucky (pronounced "fork") is a group of companies principally owned by Terry E. Forcht, with corporate headquarters in Lexington, Kentucky and Corbin, Kentucky. The corporation employs more than 2,100 people in many companies specializing in banking and financial services, insurance, nursing homes and health care, broadcasting and print media, retail, data and Web design services, real estate and construction. Forcht Group of Kentucky officially changed its name from First Corbin Financial Corporation on November 10, 2007.  The company also sponsors "The Forcht Group of Kentucky Center for Excellence in Leadership" lecture series which began in 2005 at University of the Cumberlands, where Terry Forcht formerly taught business.

Forcht Bank
The largest of Forcht Group's businesses is Forcht Bancorp, which is a management services company for Forcht Bank which has 34 locations in 12 Kentucky counties with total assets of more than $1 billion ranking it among the top 10 Kentucky-based banks in the Commonwealth. In December 2007, Forcht Bank was formed by merging the 11 banks that Forcht Bancorp owned. The bank's locations were formerly named Boone National Bank, Campbellsville National Bank, Deposit Bank and Trust Co., First National Bank of Lexington, Laurel National Bank, PRP National Bank, Somerset National Bank, Tri-County National Bank, Williamsburg National Bank, and Eagle Bank. Forcht Bank is based in Lexington, and Forcht Bancorp's headquarters is in Corbin and Lexington. The bank's slogan is "A New Direction in Banking."  Forcht Bank is the title sponsor for the State Baseball Championship tournament at Applebee's Park in Lexington, Ky.

Forcht Broadcasting
On April 23, 2008, Forcht Group of Kentucky announced that Key Broadcasting had been rebranded as Forcht Broadcasting.  Forcht Broadcasting currently operates 24 radio stations across 12 areas in Illinois, Indiana and Kentucky.  Forcht Broadcasting stations are affiliates for a variety of pro, college and local sports, including the UK Sports Network, NASCAR, IndyCar, Cincinnati Reds, St. Louis Cardinals, Nashville Predators, Cincinnati Bengals, Indianapolis Colts and local high school sports.

List of companies

Banking and financial services
Forcht Bancorp, which operates 34 banking centers in 12 counties with total assets of more than a billion dollars.
First Corbin Bank Services, Inc.
First Financial Appraisals, Inc.
First Leasing, LLC
Columbia Bancshares, Inc.*
1st Hamburg, LLC
First Financial Credit, Inc.
Key Motor Club, LLC
First Corbin Hedge Fund, LLC

Health care
Parkway Realty, Inc.
Forcht Pharmacy
Forcht Diagnostic Laboratory
Management Advisors, Inc.
Health Realty, LLC
Barbourville Realty, LLC
Harlan Realty, LLC
Williamsburg Realty, LLC
Bacon Creek Realty, LLC
Hazard Realty, LLC
Knott County Realty, LLC
Wolfe County Realty, LLC
Hyden Nursing Home Realty, LLC

Broadcast and print media
1st Media, LLC
Forcht Broadcasting, Inc.
Key Management, Inc.
Tri-County Radio Broadcasting, Inc.
S.I.P Broadcasting, Inc.
T.C.W. Broadcasting, Inc.
C.V.L. Broadcasting, Inc.
V.L.N. Broadcasting, Inc.
F.T.G. Broadcasting, Inc.
P.R.S. Broadcasting, Inc.
H.O.P. Broadcasting, Inc.
HOP Realty, LLC
SIP Realty, LLC
FTG Realty, LLC
The Whitley Whiz, Inc., which publishes the Corbin and Williamsburg News Journal
The Hamburg Home Journal, LLC

Insurance
Kentucky National Insurance Company
Forcht Insurance Agency, LLC
Hamburg Insurance, LLC
Corbin Insurance, LLC
First Kentucky Insurance, LLC
Kentucky Home Life Insurance

Retail
My Favorite Things, LLC
First Jewelry and Gifts, Inc.

Technology
Key Technology, LLC
Input Data, LLC
BSC Data, LLC

Service group
Forcht Construction, LLC
First Construction Landscaping, LLC
Terry E. Forcht S/P
Key Association S/P
Key Management S/P
First Corbin Investment S/P
First Corbin Financial.com, Inc.

Real estate
First Corbin, LLC
Second Corbin, LLC
Old Rosebud, LLC
Billy Town Realty, LLC
First Corbin Realty, LLC
Forrest Hills, LLC
Land Company of Columbia, Inc.
Forcht Investment S/P
Land Company of Corbin, Inc.
I.P. Realty, LLC
Queen Hill, LLC
Land Company of Danville, Inc.
MA Realty, LLC
Radio IAI, LLC
Duke Publishing, LLC
First Air, LLC
Huff, Farmer and Forcht PTR*
Huff & Associates, LLC*
Forcht & Patrick PTR*
Forcht, Patrick & Frazier PTR*

*Minority ownership

References

External links
Forcht Group homepage
Forcht Bank homepage
Article on Terry Forcht in March 2008 issue of The Lane Report
Story on Terry Forcht and Forcht Group in the Lexington Herald-Leader
 Corbin, Williamsburg banks now named for founder
Article on First Corbin published in the ABA Banking Journal

Banks based in Kentucky
Companies based in Lexington, Kentucky
Banks established in 1985
1985 establishments in Kentucky
Corbin, Kentucky